Isak Öhrström (born 26 November 1990) is a Swedish slalom canoeist and an Olympian who has competed since 2006. 

In 2008 as a junior he made it to the final at the World Championships in the Czech Republic. He also finished 4th at the Youth Olympic Games in Sydney 2009 after winning the semifinal. 

In Brazil 2016 he became the first Swedish athlete in history to compete in the Olympic Games in Canoe Slalom. He finished in 15th place in the K1 event at the 2016 Summer Olympics in Rio de Janeiro.

At the World Championships in Spain 2019 he qualified a nation quota for the Tokyo Olympic Games for Sweden. 

On the first ever race on the venue that will hold the Tokyo Olympic Games he finished in 5th place.

Isak has been in several World Cup finals, including Prague 2015, Tacen 2016 and Tacen 2020 where he took the first ever world cup medal for Sweden with a gold. 

He has also won a number of races in the World Ranking Series organised by the International Canoe Federation.

World Cup individual podiums

References

External links

 

1990 births
Living people
Swedish male canoeists
Olympic canoeists of Sweden
Canoeists at the 2016 Summer Olympics